Turbopsebius diligens is a species of small-headed fly in the family Acroceridae.

References

Acroceridae
Articles created by Qbugbot
Taxa named by Carl Robert Osten-Sacken
Insects described in 1877